Johnson Lake is a glacial lake in Elmore County, Idaho, United States.

Johnson Lake may also refer to:

Lakes in the United States

Alaska
 Johnson Lake (Kenai Peninsula Borough, Alaska), in Kenai Peninsula Borough, Alaska
 Johnson Lake (Matanuska-Susitna Borough, Alaska), in Matanuska-Susitna Borough, Alaska

Arkansas
 Big Johnson Lake, in Calhoun County
 Johnson Lake (Crawford County, Arkansas), a reservoir in Crawford County
 Johnson Lake (Jackson County, Arkansas), in Jackson County
 Johnson Lake (Jefferson County, Arkansas), two lakes in Jefferson County
 Johnson Lake (Lee County, Arkansas), in Lee County
 Johnson Lake (Lonoke County, Arkansas), in Lonoke County

Idaho
 Johnson Lake, in Elmore County

Illinois
 Johnson Lake, in Johnson-Sauk Trail State Recreation Area, Henry County

Indiana
 Johnson Lake, in Otsego Township, Steuben County
 Johnson Lake, in Pleasant Township, Steuben County

Minnesota
 Johnson Lake, in Glen Township, Aitkin County, Minnesota
 Johnson Lake, in Hazelton Township, Aitkin County, Minnesota
 Johnson Lake, in Spencer Township, Aitkin County, Minnesota
 Johnson Lake, in Eagle View Township, Becker County, Minnesota
 Johnson Lake, in Lake View Township, Becker County, Minnesota
 Johnson Lake, in Round Lake Township, Becker County, Minnesota
 Johnson Lake, in White Earth Township, Becker County, Minnesota
 Johnson Lake, in San Francisco Township, Carver County, Minnesota
 Johnson Lake, in Becker Township, Cass County
 Johnson Lake, in Inguadona Township, Cass County
 Johnson Lake, in Powers Township, Cass County
 Johnson Lake, in Torrey Township, Cass County
 Johnson Lake, in Lake Elizabeth Township, Kandiyohi County, Minnesota

Montana
 Johnson Lake (Flathead County, Montana), in Flathead County
 Johnson Lake (Gallatin County, Montana), in Gallatin County
 Johnson Lake (Granite County, Montana), in Granite County
 Johnson Lake (Roosevelt County, Montana), in Roosevelt County
 Johnson Lake (Sheridan County, Montana), in Sheridan County
 Ruby Johnson Lake, in Toole County
 Johnson Lake, in the Anaconda-Pintler Wilderness

Nebraska
 Johnson Lake, a reservoir between Dawson County and Gosper County

Oklahoma
Lake Jed Johnson, a reservoir in the Wichita Mountains

Oregon
 Johnson Lake, former name of Tenmile Lake (Oregon)

South Dakota
 Johnson Lake, South Dakota, in Oakwood Lakes State Park, Brookings County

Texas
Lake Lyndon B. Johnson, a reservoir in the Texas Hill Country

Wisconsin
 Johnson Lake, in Bayfield County
 Johnson Lakes, two lakes in Burnett County
 Johnson Lake, in Oconto County
 Johnson Lake, in Oneida County
 Johnson Lake, in Polk County
 Johnson Lake, in Portage County
 Johnson Lake, in Price County
 Johnson Lakes, two lakes in Sawyer County
 Johnson Lakes, two lakes in Vilas County
 Johnson Lake, in Washburn County
 Johnson Lake, in Waupaca County

Lakes in Canada
 Johnson Lake, in Haliburton Forest, Haliburton County, Ontario
 Johnson Lake, in McMurrich/Monteith, Parry Sound District, Ontario
 Johnson Lake, part of the outflow of Summit Lake (Timiskaming District), Ontario

Other uses
 Johnson Lake Airport, an airport in Alberta, Canada 
 Johnson Lake Mine Historic District, in Great Basin National Park, Nevada, United States
 Johnson Lake National Wildlife Refuge, North Dakota, United States
 Johnson Lake Shelters, a historic site in McIntosh County, Oklahoma, United States
 Johnson Lake State Recreation Area, a state park on the Kenai Peninsula, Alaska

See also
Lake Johnson, a glacial lake in the South Island of New Zealand